Nizhniye Tashly (Tübänge Taşlı) is a rural locality (a selo) and the administrative centre of Nizhnetashlinsky Selsoviet, Sharansky District, Bashkortostan, Russia. The population was 443 as of 2010. There are 5 streets.

Geography 
Nizhniye Tashly is located 32 km northwest of Sharan (the district's administrative centre) by road. Verkhniye Tashly is the nearest rural locality.

References 

Rural localities in Sharansky District